Pyrgos is a mountain village located in Corinthia, Greece. It is part of the municipality of Xylokastro-Evrostina.

Populated places in Corinthia